

The 2nd Street Tunnel is a widely filmed and photographed tunnel on 2nd Street under Bunker Hill in Downtown Los Angeles, California. The Los Angeles Times described it as "the most recognizable city landmark most Americans have never heard of".

The tunnel was built to relieve congestion on the earlier 3rd Street Tunnel. Construction began in 1916 and was completed in 1924, with its formal opening on July 25 of that year. The distinctive white tiles, which give the tunnel its glow, came from Germany, which caused controversy at the time due to Anti-German sentiment at the onset of World War I.

The tunnel runs from South Figueroa Street at the northwest to Hill Street at the southeast. 2nd Street also runs above for two blocks at the surface from Hill Street at the southwest to South Hope Street.

The two entrances are very different in character, automotive columnist Dan Neil describing the contrast of "the grittier east entrance and the glowing aperture of the west side, with flaring buttresses reminiscent of the shell of the Hollywood Bowl."

Traffic
The tunnel has two-way traffic. It previously had four lanes (two in each direction), but in late 2013 a bike lane in each direction was added, resulting in one car lane and one bike lane in each direction.

In popular culture
The tunnel appears frequently in car advertisements from many manufacturers. Seventy-three car ads were filmed in the tunnel from 2006 to 2008, averaging more than two per month.

The tunnel has appeared in many movies, including THX 1138 (1971), The Terminal Man (1974), The Driver (1978), Invasion of the Body Snatchers (1978), When a Stranger Calls (1979), Blade Runner (1982), Flashdance (1983), The Terminator (1984), Repo Man (1984), Rocky IV (1985), Lethal Weapon 2 (1989), Sneakers (1992), Deep Cover (1992), Demolition Man (1993), Money Talks (1997), Con Air (1997), Gattaca (1997), Enemy of the State (1998), Independence Day (1996), Kill Bill (2003), Transformers (2007), Kill Speed (2010), Black November (2012), and Knight of Cups (2015).

The 2nd Street tunnel has been featured in music videos such as "Iris" by Goo Goo Dolls, "It’s Over Now" by Neve, "We R Who We R" by Kesha, "It's My Life" by Bon Jovi, "Kings and Queens" by Thirty Seconds to Mars, "Grenade" by Bruno Mars, "Sing" by My Chemical Romance, "Protovision" by Kavinsky, "Bet" by Tinashe, "Feel Good (feat. Daya)" by Gryffin and Illenium, "Narcissist" by Halo Circus, "Please Me" by Bruno Mars and Cardi B, "You Can't Stop The Girl" by Bebe Rexha and Blinding Lights by The Weeknd.

The tunnel has also been used for fashion shows, including the 2004 LA Fashion Week show by designer Michelle Mason, and for parties, such as the 2013 Golden Globe Awards the Art of Elysium/Audi party.

See also
 J. Win Austin, Los Angeles, California, City Council member, 1941–43, condemned auto-horn noise in tunnel
 Charles E. Downs, City  Council member convicted in a bribery scheme involving a "moving sidewalk" in the tunnel

References

External links 

 flickr images of 2nd Street Tunnel with Creative Commons licenses
 Blog entry

Bunker Hill, Los Angeles
Road tunnels in California
Tunnels completed in 1924
Tunnels in Los Angeles